Abar, The First Black Superman is a 1977 blaxploitation superhero film directed by Frank Packard and starring J. Walter Smith, Tobar Mayo, and Roxie Young. When it was released on VHS in 1990, it was re-titled In Your Face.

Premise
Upon moving into a bigoted neighbourhood, the scientist father of a persecuted black family gives a superpower elixir to a tough bodyguard, who then becomes a superpowered crimefighter.

Cast
 J. Walter Smith as Dr. Kinkade
 Tobar Mayo as John Abar
 Roxie Young as Mrs. Kinkade
 Gladys Lum as Debbie Kinkade
 Tony Rumford as Tommie Kinkade
 Rupert Williams as Jim Kinkade
 Tina James as Susan Kinkade
 Art Jackson as Dudley
 Allen Ogle as Peabody
 Joe Alberti as Hunt
 Dee Turguand as Mabel

Production
The film was the brainchild of James Smalley, a black pimp from Louisiana, and Frank Packard, a white actor and screenwriter; it was filmed partly in a working whorehouse. Smalley ran out of money before the film was completed, and had to sell the film to the owner of a film processing lab to settle his unpaid bills.

Originally titled SuperBlack, it was completed in 1975, but not released until 1977, under the name Abar, The First Black Superman; it would be renamed again for VHS release as In Your Face. Its original release was very limited, primarily to what was known as the "Chitlin' Circuit" of Southern drive-ins.

The film was shot in the Baldwin Hills and Watts neighbourhoods of Los Angeles without permits to do so, and at one point actual motorcycle gang members who had been hired to play a black motorcycle gang surrounded the cars of the white police officers who had been called in to shut down shooting. The officers chose to stay in their cars.

References

External links
 
 
 

Blaxploitation films
1970s superhero films
American superhero films
Film superheroes
1970s English-language films
1970s American films